Daniel Harry Kemp (born 11 January 1999) is an English professional footballer who plays as a midfielder for Hartlepool United on loan from  club Milton Keynes Dons.

Club career

Early career
Kemp joined the academy of Chelsea at the age of six, and spent ten years with the club before his move across London to West Ham United in 2015.

West Ham United
Having progressed through to West Ham's U23 development squad, in which he featured in several EFL Trophy ties, Kemp moved on loan to League Two club Stevenage in January 2020, followed by League One club Blackpool on a season-long loan deal in September 2020. He scored his first goal for Blackpool in an EFL Trophy tie against Leeds United U21s on 11 November 2020.

Leyton Orient
Kemp was recalled from his loan by West Ham on 15 January 2021, and moved to Leyton Orient on a permanent basis on a two-and-a-half-year contract.

Milton Keynes Dons
On 31 January 2022, Kemp joined League One club Milton Keynes Dons on a permanent deal for an undisclosed fee. He made his debut on 5 February 2022 as an 88th-minute substitute in a 2–1 home win over Lincoln City.

Hartlepool United (loan)
On 31 January 2023, Kemp returned to League Two when he joined Hartlepool United on loan until the end of the season. Kemp said he saw the loan move as a 'massive opportunity' for him. After scoring five times in six games, Kemp won the EFL League Two Player of the Month award for February 2023.

International career
He has been capped by England at U19 and U20 level.

Career statistics

Honours
Individual
EFL League Two Player of the Month: February 2023

References

1999 births
Living people
Footballers from Sidcup
English footballers
Chelsea F.C. players
West Ham United F.C. players
Stevenage F.C. players
Blackpool F.C. players
Leyton Orient F.C. players
Milton Keynes Dons F.C. players
Hartlepool United F.C. players
English Football League players
Association football midfielders
England youth international footballers